Tellinella listeri, the speckled tellin, is a bivalve mollusc in the family Tellinidae, the tellins.

Distribution
St. Vincent, Barbados and other Eastern Caribbean islands
in sandy areas at 5-15 metres depth, and as far North as the Florida Keys.

References

 Turgeon, D. D., W. G. Lyons, P. Mikkelsen, G. Rosenberg, and F. Moretzsohn. 2009. Bivalvia (Mollusca) of the Gulf of Mexico, Pp. 711–744 in Felder, D.L. and D.K. Camp (eds.), Gulf of Mexico–Origins, Waters, and Biota. Biodiversity. Texas A&M Press, Colleg 
 Huber M. (2015). Compendium of Bivalves 2. Harxheim: ConchBooks. 907 pp.

External links
 Röding, P. F. (1798). Museum Boltenianum sive Catalogus cimeliorum e tribus regnis naturæ quæ olim collegerat Joa. Fried Bolten, M. D. p. d. per XL. annos proto physicus Hamburgensis. Pars secunda continens Conchylia sive Testacea univalvia, bivalvia & multivalvia. Trapp, Hamburg. viii, 199 pp
 Wood, W. (1815). General conchology or a description of shells, arranged according to the Linnean system. London, John Booth. Vol. 1, lxi + 7 + 246 pp., 60 p

Tellinidae
Bivalves described in 1798